Collix stellata is a moth in the family Geometridae first described by William Warren in 1894. It is found in Korea, Japan, Taiwan and northern India.

The ground colour of the forewings is light greyish, the costa thinly covered with dark brown scales. The hindwing ground colour is light greyish with blackish transverse lines in the basal, medial and subterminal areas. Adults are on wing from early September to October in Korea and Taiwan and in June in Japan.

The larvae feed on Rapanea nerifolia and Lysimachia clethroides in Japan.

Subspecies
Collix stellata stellata
Collix stellata oblitera Prout, 1935 (Java)
Collix stellata phaeochiton Prout, 1932 (Peninsular Malaysia, Borneo)

References

Moths described in 1894
Moths of Korea
Moths of Japan
Moths of Taiwan
stellata
Taxa named by William Warren (entomologist)